The mayor of Columbia, South Carolina is elected at large for a four-year term. The duties of the mayor is to create policy and enact laws, rules and regulations for the city of Columbia. Daniel Rickenmann, who assumed office on January 4, is the current mayor of Columbia.

Intendants and Mayors of Columbia, South Carolina

See also
 Timeline of Columbia, South Carolina

References

 Information obtained from Columbia & Richland County: A South Carolina Community 1740–1990 by John Hammond Moore (University of South Carolina Press, 1993). 

 Columbia
columbia